The Ireland national under-16 basketball team is a national basketball team of Island of Ireland, administered by Basketball Ireland. It represents the country in international under-16 basketball competitions. The team appeared at the FIBA U16 European Championship Division B several times.

Team

References

External links
Archived records of Ireland team participations
U16 Squad Announcement

under-16
Men's national under-16 basketball teams